Ivan is an unincorporated community and census-designated place (CDP) in Dallas County, Arkansas, United States. Ivan has a post office with ZIP code 71748. It was first listed as a CDP in the 2020 census with a population of 135.

Demographics

2020 census

Note: the US Census treats Hispanic/Latino as an ethnic category. This table excludes Latinos from the racial categories and assigns them to a separate category. Hispanics/Latinos can be of any race.

Education
It is in the Fordyce School District, which operates Fordyce High School.

References

Unincorporated communities in Dallas County, Arkansas
Unincorporated communities in Arkansas
Census-designated places in Arkansas
Census-designated places in Dallas County, Arkansas